Tung Wah Group of Hospitals Wong Fut Nam College is a Hong Kong secondary school. Fully subsidized by the Government of Hong Kong, the day school is located in Oxford Road, Kowloon Tong, Kowloon.

Foundation 
Being the first secondary school founded by the Tung Wah Group of Hospitals, the oldest and largest charitable organizations in Hong Kong, the school was initially named Tung Wah Group of Hospitals Number One College upon the school's establishment on 8 September 1961. It was then bestowed the current name after Wong Fut-nam, a local entrepreneur and philanthropist, donated HK$500,000 in the autumn of 1971.

Extra-curricular activities 
Tung Wah Group of Hospitals, sponsoring body of the school, arranged in 2017 a two-week joint school overseas language immersion program, including a trip to Vancouver, for students. The school is also famous for its athletic team, a frequent winner of various sports competition in the districts.

Long hair 
In 2022, student Nathan Lam Chak-chun filed a complaint with the Equal Opportunities Commission, alleging that the school broke the Sex Discrimination Ordinance and pressured him to cut his long hair.

See also 
 Tung Wah Group of Hospitals
 Education in Hong Kong
 List of secondary schools in Hong Kong
 Lists of schools in Hong Kong

Reference

External links 
Tung Wah Group of Hospitals Wong Fut Nam College

Wong Fut Nam College
Wong Fut Nam College
Educational institutions established in 1961
Secondary schools in Hong Kong
1961 establishments in Hong Kong
Kowloon Tong